Maharan Radi (born 1 July 1982) is an Israeli footballer who plays for Hapoel Nof HaGalil. He was capped 10 times by the Israel national team between 2012 and 2014.

Club career
An Arab citizen of Israel, Radi started his career at the Maccabi Tel Aviv youth team. In 2006, he was promoted with his team Maccabi Herzliya to the Israeli Premier League and won the Toto Cup in the next season. In 2011–12 Radi played for Bnei Sakhnin, ending the season with 13 goals and 10 assists, being one of the major factors making his team reach the top playoff. In 2012–13 he joined his youth club, Maccabi Tel Aviv, where a small group of youths chanted racist slogans towards him during his first training session. Radi scored eight goals and made 11 assists as Maccabi Tel Aviv won the championship that season. In 2013–14, he participated in the Europa League group stage and the round of 32 with Maccabi.

International
On 2 September 2012 Radi received his first call-up to the Israeli national team from coach Eli Guttman. The following month he scored on his second appearance for the national team in a qualifier against Luxembourg.

Honours

Club
Israeli Premier League (6): 2012–13, 2013–14, 2014–15, 2015–16, 2016–17, 2017–18
Toto cup top Division (3): 2006–07, 2014–15, 2016–17
Israel State Cup (1): 2014–15 
Toto Cup Artzit (1): 2004–05
Israel Super Cup (1): 2016

Individual
Israeli Premier League – 2011–12 Most assists (10)
Israeli Premier League – 2012–13 Most assists (11)

International goals

|-
| 1. || 12 October 2012 ||Stade Josy Barthel, City of Luxembourg, Luxembourg ||  || 1–0 || 6–0 || 2014 FIFA World Cup qualification
|-
|}

References

1982 births
Living people
Israeli footballers
Israel international footballers
Hapoel Majd al-Krum F.C. players
Maccabi Kafr Kanna F.C. players
Hapoel Ashkelon F.C. players
Maccabi Herzliya F.C. players
Bnei Yehuda Tel Aviv F.C. players
Hapoel Acre F.C. players
Bnei Sakhnin F.C. players
Maccabi Tel Aviv F.C. players
Hapoel Be'er Sheva F.C. players
F.C. Kafr Qasim players
Hapoel Nof HaGalil F.C. players
Liga Leumit players
Israeli Premier League players
People from Sulam
Footballers from Northern District (Israel)
Arab citizens of Israel
Arab-Israeli footballers
Association football midfielders